A house organ (also variously known  an in-house magazine, in-house publication, house journal, shop paper, plant paper, or employee magazine) is a magazine or periodical published by a company or organization for its customers, employees, union members, parishioners, political party members, and so forth.  This name derives from the use of "organ" as referring to a periodical for a special interest group.

House organs typically come in two types, internal and external. An internal house organ is meant for consumption by the employees of the company as a channel of communication for the management. An external house organ is meant for consumption by the customers of the company, and may be either a free regular newsletter, or an actual commercial product in its own right.

References

Further reading 
 
 
 
 
 
 
 
 
 
 
 
 
 
Communication Through House Journals - a research study, authored by Dr.A.SreekumarMenon  published in a book of Readings 'Emerging Challenges in Management' edited by Dr.A.S.Menon and Dr.K.Shyamanna  C.B.H. Publications, Trivandrum, KeralaState, India, 1990, pages175-182

 
Promotion and marketing communications
Periodicals